This is a list of motorcycles produced by the James Cycle Co.

98cc
Autocycle (Deluxe and Superluxe)
Comet
Commodore

125cc
 M.L. (1945-1948)
 Cadet 125 (Rigid-frame, J5, and J6)

150cc
Cadet 150 (J15, L15, Flying Cadet L15a, Cadet M15, and Cadet M16) 
Scooter (SC1/SC4)

175cc
 Cavalier L17 (1958-1959)

200cc
Captain (Rigid-frame, J8 Deluxe "Plunger", K7, L20, Sports Captain L20S)

225cc
 Colonel K12

250cc
 Commodore L25 (1957-1962)
 Superswift (1962-1963)
 L25T Commando (1959-1962)
 M25T Trials (1963-1966)
 Cotsworth L25S scrambles (1959-1962)
 M25R Scrambler and M25RS (1963-1966)

References
James Motorcycles Information Website
James Motorcycle Website - resources and manuals

James
James motorcycles